The North China sika deer or Mandarin sika deer (Cervus nippon mandarinus) is one of the many subspecies of sika deer. It is a large subspecies with some of the most prominent spots of all subspecies, which is permanent throughout the year. It previously inhabited lowland forests of North China Plain and Northeast China Plain. Because of intensive habitat alterations the subspecies was endangered centuries ago, surviving only in remote areas of northeastern China and the Qing Imperial Hunting Grounds. Though no surveys have been conducted on the subspecies' status, there have been no sightings for many decades and it is reasonable to presume that it is extinct in the wild. Although it is fairly common in zoos and purebred North China sika deer is a valuable breed in the Asian antler farming industry, the lack of suitable habitats and government efforts makes reintroduction impossible.

References

Cervus
Mammals of Asia